Matthew "Matt" Wiebe,  is a Canadian politician, who was elected to the Legislative Assembly of Manitoba in a by-election on March 2, 2010. He succeeded the province's former premier, Gary Doer (NDP). A member of the New Democratic Party of Manitoba (NDP), he represents the electoral district of Concordia. He was re-elected in 2011, 2016 and 2019. Wiebe currently serves as Whip for the NDP's Official Opposition and the Critic for the departments of Municipal Relations and Infrastructure.

Matt Wiebe was born and raised in the northeast Winnipeg suburb of East Kildonan. He attended River East Collegiate and graduated in 1997. He attended the University of Winnipeg, from which he graduated with a Bachelor of Arts degree in economics. He went on to earn a master's degree in public administration at the same university.

Prior to holding elected office, Wiebe worked as a constituency assistant in the offices of Doer (provincially) and NDP Member of Parliament Bill Blaikie (federally).

Electoral record

References

External links
Matt Wiebe Official Website

New Democratic Party of Manitoba MLAs
Politicians from Winnipeg
University of Manitoba alumni
Living people
21st-century Canadian politicians
1979 births
Canadian people of German descent
Canadian Mennonites